Trevor Lloyd (5 September 1924 – 5 October 2015) was a  international rugby union player.

Lloyd hailed from Port Talbot, where he started playing club rugby with the Aberavon Quins RFC, he made his debut for Wales on 14 March 1953 versus Ireland and was selected for the 1955 British Lions tour to South Africa. He also played club rugby for Maesteg RFC, captaining the team for three seasons, and coached the senior club from 1956 to 1959. Lloyd finished his playing career at home town club Aberavon Harlequins where during the 1955/56 season and directly after touring with the Lions, he captained the side into their inaugural season as a club of the Welsh Rugby Union. Lloyd died on 5 October 2015.

References 

1924 births
2015 deaths
Aberavon RFC players
British & Irish Lions rugby union players from Wales
Cwmavon RFC players
Glamorgan County RFC players
Maesteg RFC players
Rugby union players from Port Talbot
Rugby union scrum-halves
Wales international rugby union players
Welsh rugby union coaches
Welsh rugby union players